The 29th Saturn Awards, honoring the best in science fiction, fantasy and horror film and television in 2002, were held on May 18, 2003 at the Renaissance Hollywood Hotel in Los Angeles, California. This ceremony revived the Best Animated Film category, which had been last given out at the 10th Saturn Awards in 1983. The nominees were announced on March 6, 2003.

Below is a complete list of nominees and winners. Winners are highlighted in bold.

Winners and nominees

Film

Television

Programs

Acting

DVD

Special awards

Cinescape Genre Face of the Future Award

The Filmmaker's Showcase Award
 Bill Paxton

The Special Achievement Award
 Bob Weinstein and Harvey Weinstein

The Dr. Donald A. Reed Award
 James Cameron

The Life Career Award
 Sid and Marty Krofft and Kurt Russell

References

External links
 2003 Awards at IMDb
 The Official Saturn Awards Site

Saturn Awards ceremonies
2002 television awards
2002 film awards